Sanischare refugee camp (Nepali: शनिस्चरे शरणार्थी शिविर; Śaniscare śaraṇārthī śivira), located near Sanischare, Kosi, Nepal, is home to some 13,323 Bhutanese refugees. The camp lies on the south side of the East-West Highway, and contains the New Horizon Academy.

In March 2011, a fire burned much of the camp destroying about 1,200 homes. The same day, another fire also struck Goldhap, another Bhutanese refugee camp in Nepal.

See also
Bhutanese refugees

References

Refugee camps in Nepal
Bhutanese refugee camps